The Flaming Lips and Heady Fwends is the first album in the "Fwends" series by the American rock band the Flaming Lips in collaboration with a variety of guests.

Recorded throughout 2011 and 2012, the album was released as a limited edition on vinyl for Record Store Day on April 21, 2012 and on CD, vinyl and digitally on June 26, 2012. Four songs from the album were previously released on collaborative EPs in 2011.

Background
Following their last full-length album, 2009's Embryonic, the band produced several EPs with other artists including Neon Indian, Lightning Bolt, Prefuse 73, and Yoko Ono.  Four tracks from these sessions appear on the album.  The remaining seven songs were recorded at different times and locations, and are exclusive to the LP. The CD, vinyl reissue and digital releases of the album omit the track "I Don't Want You to Die" featuring Chris Martin, but feature an exclusive track with Aaron Behrens of Ghostland Observatory, "Tasered and Maced".

The Erykah Badu version of Ewan MacColl's "The First Time Ever I Saw Your Face", was a result of Lips frontman Wayne Coyne's unsolicited calls to the singer. Badu was initially opposed to covering the well-known 1957 song, but Coyne was able to convince her.

Other pairings resulted from the initiative of other artists, such as the Kesha track. Kesha had expressed interest in working with the Flaming Lips while visiting the band's hometown, Oklahoma City. She contacted Coyne by text message on his birthday. Her track, "2012 (You Must Be Upgraded)", was recorded in Kesha's home studio in Nashville.

Reception

Pitchfork commented on the wide variety of collaborators; mainstream artists such as Kesha and Coldplay's Chris Martin share space with more experimental artists such as Lightning Bolt and Prefuse 73. Despite the disparate artists involved, Pitchfork stated "[t]his piecemeal patchwork of tracks hangs together amazingly well as a front-to-back album." The website rated the album 8.2 out of 10. Entertainment Weekly gave the album an A rating. Spin was less positive; giving a 6 out of 10 rating, they quipped that the other artists were "globetrotters on Gilligan's Acid Island". Clash commented that the numerous guests tempered the band's usual outlandish workouts but did note that "Whilst that suppressed weirdness may be a detraction to the diehard fans, it makes for the band's most accessible work since Yoshimi...."

The music video for "First Time Ever I Saw Your Face" provoked controversy between the band and guest vocalist Erykah Badu when a rough cut was leaked online that misrepresented Badu. As a result, this video was never officially released, however new vocals were recorded featuring Amanda Palmer, and a similar video to the one with Badu was filmed also featuring Palmer.

Packaging
The band released the double LP in vinyl form in a 10,000 unit run on April 21, 2012, as part of Record Store Day. Each disc was hand-pressed using multiple shades of vinyl pellets and has a unique pattern. Coyne claimed that he had requested and was given blood samples from some of the album's collaborators, including Kesha and Neon Indian's Alan Palomo. His plan was to have small amounts of the blood sandwiched into the vinyl of a limited edition of the album, and make them available to "interested rich Flaming Lips people." The double LPs with blood inside were pressed at United Record Pressing in Nashville. Custom editions have been sold via the headyfwends.com site: One copy was traded for two copies of prominent United customer Jack White's blue liquid-filled 12" single "Sixteen Saltines" (a Record Store Day 2012 exclusive only available at the Third Man Records store). 10 more copies (encased in plexiglass with a photo collage cover made from the front cover photo of John Lennon and Yoko Ono's Unfinished Music No.1: Two Virgins) were sold by Wayne Coyne for $2,500 USD each (plus $200 hand-delivery fee), with the proceeds going to the Oklahoma Humane Society and the Academy of Contemporary Music at the University of Central Oklahoma. Customers who bought a copy of this edition also received a copy of the regular vinyl set for listening. The records were hand-delivered by AnatomyOne, of Oklahoma City's Womb Gallery, and photos of the buyers holding their copies were linked on Coyne's Twitter account.

Track listing

Compact disc and digital editions

Vinyl original RSD edition

Vinyl reissue edition

Vinyl edition has locked grooves at the end of each side.

References

External links
The official website for selling the blood vinyl version
Wayne Coyne walks through The Flaming Lips and Heady Fwends

2012 albums
Collaborative albums
Record Store Day releases
The Flaming Lips albums
Warner Records albums
Bella Union albums